Francis J. Bloustein (May 17, 1906 - May 16, 1984) was a New York Supreme Court justice. He was the brother of Edward J. Bloustein.

References

New York Supreme Court Justices
1906 births
1984 deaths
20th-century American judges